Cold War History may refer to:
 Cold War
 Cold War History (journal)